Red silver ore may refer to:

 Proustite, also known as light red silver or ruby silver ore
 Pyrargyrite, also known as dark red silver ore or ruby silver ore